Aming (あみん) is female Japanese pop/folk duo composed of Takako Okamura and Haruko Kato that debuted in 1982 with their hit "Matsu wa". However, they disbanded quickly, in November 1983.

They have released a new album in 2007 titled "In the Prime" for the 25th anniversary.

Sources
https://web.archive.org/web/20061207055722/http://www.bekkoame.ne.jp/~bluemt/T_Okamura/index_E.html
The Japanese Wikipedia

External links
 Official Website
 Introduction from BMG JAPAN

Japanese pop music groups
Musical groups established in 1982
Musical groups from Aichi Prefecture
1982 establishments in Japan
Pop-folk music groups